Elkhorn Creek is a  long stream in Marion County, Oregon, United States. The stream's valley is surrounded by the western Cascade foothills, covered with coniferous trees characteristic of the Pacific Northwest, and lined with red alders at the water's edge. The creek supports runs of rainbow and coastal cutthroat trout, as well as Pacific giant salamanders. On September 30, 1996, a  portion of the stream, from the mouth nearly to the source, was protected as part of the National Wild and Scenic Rivers System.

In 2011 and 2012, the Bureau of Land Management (BLM) performed a restoration project to improve habitat for chinook salmon and rainbow trout to spawn. The BLM placed logs in the lower section of Elkhorn Creek to slow its flow, and planted trees beside the creek to shade and cool the water and to provide future sources of wood for naturally fallen logs to repeat the process.

See also
 List of rivers of Oregon

References

External links
 
 North Santiam Watershed Council

Rivers of Marion County, Oregon
Rivers of Oregon
Wild and Scenic Rivers of the United States